

Storms
Note:  indicates the name was retired after that usage in the respective basin

Pabling (2001) – a weak tropical depression that persisted in the South China Sea.

Pablo
 1995 – did not affect land.
 2004 – a tropical depression that was only recognized by PAGASA.
 2008 – affected the Philippines as a weak tropical storm.
 2012 – very intense typhoon that struck Mindanao, Philippines.
 2019 – a Category 1 hurricane that became the easternmost Atlantic hurricane on record.

Pabuk
 2001 – struck Japan.
 2007 – struck Taiwan and China.
 2013 – classified as a typhoon by the JTWC.
 2019 – a weak storm that struck the Malay Peninsula in January 2019.

Paddy
1981 – did not impact land
2021 – did not impact land

Paeng
 2006 – made landfall over the Philippines after its peak strength as a category 5 typhoon.
 2014 – a typhoon that became a Category 5 super typhoon, but did not make landfall.
 2018 – another Category 5 super typhoon that later made landfall in Japan as a weaker system.
 2022 – a deadly tropical cyclone that caused widespread damage across the Philippines and later impacted Hong Kong and Macau.

Page
1990 – a Category 5 super typhoon that became the fourth typhoon to strike Japan in three months.
1994 – a Category 2 typhoon that stayed out to sea and was difficult to track, having the largest track error of any typhoon in 1994.

Paine
 1986 – a Category 2 hurricane that contributed to one of the most significant flooding events in Oklahoma history.
 1992 – minimal hurricane that stayed away from any land.
 2016 – minimal hurricane that affected Baja California.
 2022 – a weak tropical storm, dissipated in the open ocean.

Paka (1997) – originated in the Central Pacific and became a Category 5 super typhoon, affecting the Pacific islands, bringing total damages of up to US$580 million.

Pakhar
2012 – struck Vietnam.
2017 – impacted South China.
2022 – remained out at sea.

Pali (2016) – earliest forming tropical cyclone in the East or Central Pacific after forming on January 7, became a Category 2 hurricane.

Paloma (2008) – sixth most intense November Atlantic hurricane on record; affected Cuba causing about US$450 million in damages.

Pam
1974 – affected Vanuatu and New Caledonia.
1997 – did not affect any land.
2015 – as the second most intense tropical cyclone of the south Pacific Ocean in terms of sustained winds and is regarded as one of the worst natural disasters in the history of Vanuatu.

Pamela
1954 – Category 5 typhoon in the South China Sea that affected South China.
1958 – did not affect any land.
1961 – a Category 5 typhoon that crossed the island and the Taiwan Strait, the storm hit east China.
1964 – did not affect any land.
1966 –a category 2 typhoon made two landfalls with typhoon strength over Masbate and Mindoro before emerging from the South China Sea as a tropical storm.
1970 – brought rains and winds to the Philippines, but no major damage was reported.
1972 – a category 3 typhoon struck Philippines and Hong Kong killing one person.
1976 – a powerful typhoon that struck the U.S. territory of Guam in May 1976, causing about $500 million in damage (USD).
1979 – remained out to sea.
1982 – a Category 3 typhoon threatened Guam six years after the devastating typhoon of the same name.
2021 – a storm that made landfall in Mexico as a category 1 hurricane.

Pancho
1986 – a short-lived tropical cyclone that persisted off the coast of Western Australia.
1997 – a severe tropical cyclone that meandered in the Indian Ocean.
2008 – affected Southwestern Australia bringing rainfall.

Paolo
2013 – PAGASA name for Typhoon Wutip which impacted Vietnam as a Category 3 typhoon.
2017 – PAGASA name for Typhoon Lan, a large intense typhoon that impacted Japan.

Paring
1968
1972
1976
1980
1984 – a weak tropical depression that persisted near the Philippines
1988
1992
1996
2000

Parma
2003 – a Category 4 super typhoon that did not affect any land.
2009 – a Category 4 typhoon that impacted northern Philippines and South China; same storm as Typhoon Pepeng of 2009 below.

Pasing
1974
1978
1982
1986
1990
1994

Pat
1948 – a typhoon that did not affect land.
1951 – a Category 2 typhoon that made landfall on the Philippines and China.
1977 – a weak and short-lived tropical cyclone.
1982 – a Category 3 typhoon that neared the Philippines.
1985 – impacted southern Japan and was known as one of three cyclones that interacted with each other.
1991 – a Category 4 typhoon that did not affect land.
1994 – a Category 2 typhoon that did not affect land.
2010 – affected the Cook Islands.

Patricia
 1949 – a category 4 typhoon that did not affect any land.
1970 – remained in the open ocean.
1974 – caused no known damage or deaths.
2003 – remained at sea, causing no damages.
2009 – briefly affected parts of Baja California Sur, causing no damage.
2015 – strongest storm ever recorded in the Western Hemisphere, the second-strongest worldwide in terms of pressure, and the strongest in terms of 1-minute sustained winds.

Patsy
1955 – Category 4 super typhoon, struck the Philippines as a tropical storm.
1959 – Category 5 hurricane and Category 4-equivalent typhoon, crossed the International Dateline twice.
1962 – struck Samar, in the Philippines, and China.
1965 – struck the Philippines.
1967– struck China and North Vietnam.
1970 – Category 4 super typhoon, struck the Philippines and North Vietnam.
1973 – Category 5-equivalent super typhoon, brushed the Philippines.
1977 – remained out at sea.

Patty (2012) – a weak, short-lived tropical storm off The Bahamas.

Paul
 1978 – made landfall in western Mexico. 
 1980 – affected much of Queensland.
 1982 – killed over 1,000 in Central America. 
 1994 – never threatened land. 
 1999 – a disorganized tropical storm.
 2000 – a severe tropical cyclone that did not affect any land.
 2000 – made landfall in Hawaii as a tropical depression.  
 2006 – made landfall in Mexico as a tropical depression. 
 2010 – a tropical cyclone that brought flooding in Northern Territory of Australia.
 2012 – threatened Baja California, but weakened before landfall.
 2018 – never threatened land.

Paula
 1973 – a weak cyclone that did not impact land. 
2001 – caused extensive damage to areas of Vanuatu. 
 2010 – a small hurricane that struck Honduras and Cuba, causing minimal damage.

Paulette (2020) – a long-lasting Category 2 hurricane that impacted Bermuda.

Pauline
1947 – a Category 3 typhoon that battered northern Philippines.
1961 – remained well out at sea.
1968 – made landfall on Baja California.
1985 – threatened Hawaii.
1997 – was one of the deadliest Pacific hurricanes to make landfall in Mexico, killing more than 200 people.

Pawan (2019) – a relatively weak cyclonic storm that made landfall in Somalia.

Pearl
1948
1983 – a tropical low that was classified as a tropical cyclone during the season.
1994 – a severe tropical cyclone that had no impacts on land which later crossed over to the South-West Indian Ocean.

Pedring (2011) – a strong Category 4 typhoon that ravaged the Philippines.

Pedro (1989) – a Category 2 tropical cyclone that stayed at sea.

Peggy
1945 – a weak tropical storm which did not make landfall.
1965 – not areas land.
1986 – a Category 5 super typhoon that later made landfall on Luzon and China, killing at least 422 people.
1989 – a weak tropical storm which did not impact land.

Peipah
2007 – affected the Philippines and Vietnam as a minimal typhoon during November.
2014 – a weak tropical storm that did not affect any land.
2019 – a weak tropical storm that did not affect any land.

Peke (1987) – a Category 2 hurricane that persisted in both the Central and Northwest Pacific basins.

Peni
1980 – affected Fiji.
1990 – a severe tropical cyclone that did not affect any land.

Penny
1974 – a November Category 2 tropical cyclone; did not affect any land.
1998 – a severe tropical storm that affected Philippines.
2018 – a Category 2 tropical cyclone that affected northern Australia.

Pepang
1963
1967
1971
1975 – hit the Philippines and Vietnam
1979 – crossed southern Luzon and then made landfall near Hong Kong
1983
1987 – responsible for severe flooding in Taiwan
1991 – short-lived storm that brushed Japan
1995 – a Category 4 typhoon that crossed the central Philippines and then made landfall on eastern Vietnam, causing 110 deaths
1999 – a Category 3 typhoon that hit northern Luzon then eastern China

Pepeng
2005 – a severe tropical storm that brushed the northeastern tip of the Philippines.
2009 – a Category 4 typhoon that impacted northern Philippines and South China; same storm as Typhoon Parma of 2009 above.

Pepito (2020) – a minimal typhoon that affected both the Philippines and Vietnam.

Percy
1980 – a Category 4 typhoon that impacted Taiwan.
1983 – persisted in the South China Sea.
1987 – affected the Caroline Islands.
1990 – impacted northern Philippines and eastern China.
1993 – impacted Japan as a severe tropical storm.
2005 – a Category 5 severe tropical cyclone that did not affect any land.

Perla (2019) – a small Category 2 typhoon that did not affect any land.

Peta (2013) – a weak tropical cyclone that made landfall in northern Western Australia.

Pete (1999) –  a weak Category 2 tropical cyclone that crossed from the Australian region to the South Pacific and did not impact land.

Peter
1978 – the wettest tropical cyclone on record in Australia; caused damages throughout the Gulf of Carpentaria.
1997 – a Category 1 typhoon that made landfall in Japan.
2003 – a strong tropical storm that formed out of an extratropical gale in December, almost reaching hurricane status in the open ocean.
 2021 – a weak and poorly organized tropical storm that stayed at sea.

Petie (1950) – remained out to sea.

Pewa (2013) – a severe tropical storm that persisted in both the Central and Northwestern Pacific basins.

Phailin (2013) – was the most intense tropical cyclone to make landfall in India; damages were totalled to US$4.26 billion.

Phanfone
2002 – affected Japan.
2008 – was only recognized by the Japan Meteorological Agency as a severe tropical storm.
2014 – a Category 4 super typhoon that made landfall in Japan.
2019 – a Category 3 typhoon that struck the Philippines on Christmas, killing over 50.

Phet (2010) – a powerful tropical cyclone that made landfall on Oman, Western India, and Pakistan, killing 861 people.

Phil (1996) – a long-lasting Category 2 tropical cyclone that also affected Northern Australia.

Phethai (2018) – affected the Andhra Pradesh region in December 2018.

Philippe
2005 – a short-lived Category 1 hurricane that stayed out in Atlantic Ocean.
2011 – a Category 1 hurricane that never impacted any land.
2017 – a short-lived and weak tropical storm which affected Cuba and South Florida.

Phoebe (2004) – a weak offseason crossover cyclone from the South-West Indian Ocean to the Australian region that did not threaten land.

Phyan (2009) – a cyclonic storm that made landfall on India and brought heavy rains.

Phyllis
1953
1958
1960
1963
1966
1969
1972
1975
1978
1981
1984
1987

Pierre
1985 – brushed the coast of Queensland.
2007 – an off-season tropical cyclone that impacted Papua New Guinea.

Pilar
 1987 – a weak and short-lived tropical storm that dissipated before affecting land. 
 2017 – minimal tropical storm that brushed the Mexican coastline with heavy rainfall.

Pining
1965
1969
1977
1981
1985
1989
1993
1997

Piper (1996) – did not threaten or impact land.

Pitang
1966 – a Category 4 super typhoon that produced heavy rain over Taiwan.
1970 – a Category 5 super typhoon that made landfall on Luzon at peak intensity.

Podul
 2001 – a super typhoon that did not affect land.
 2007 – a short-lived severe tropical storm only recognized by the JMA.
 2013 – a weak tropical storm that affected the Philippines and Vietnam.
2019 – a disorganized tropical storm that affected the Philippines.

Pola (2019) – a severe tropical cyclone that affected Tonga.

Polly
1952
1956
1960
1963
1965
1968
1971 (January)
1971 (August)
1974
1978
1992 – triggered devastating floods across Fujian and Zhejiang Provinces in China. 
1993 – developed in the Australian region of the Coral Sea, crossed into the South Pacific.
1995 – brushed Luzon before curving out to sea.

Polo
 1984 – a Category 3 hurricane that struck southern Baja California as a tropical depression.
 1990 – a low-end Category 1 hurricane that remained at sea.
 2008 – a tropical storm that did not threaten land.
 2014 – a Category 1 hurricane that paralleled the Mexican coastline but did not make landfall.
 2020 – a weak November tropical storm that remained at sea.

Pongsona (2002) – a Category 4 typhoon that caused over US$730 million of damage in Guam and the Northern Mariana Islands.

Pogi (2003) – PAGASA name for Typhoon Maemi, which heavily impacted South Korea.

Prapiroon
 2000 – affected the Ryukyu Islands and Korean Peninsula.
 2006 – affected China.
 2012 – a Category 3 typhoon that meandered in the Philippine Sea.
 2018 – a minimal typhoon that brought torrential rainfall towards the Korean Peninsula.

Prema
1983 – did not affect any land.
1993 – was among the worst tropical cyclones to hit Vanuatu.

Priscilla
 1946
 1967 – a hurricane that did not impact land.
 1970 – a very weak and short-lived tropical cyclone.
 1971 – a Category 3 hurricane which made landfall on Mexico as a tropical storm.
 1975 – a tropical storm that did not impact land.
 1983 – a Category 3 hurricane which impacted the Southwestern United States despite not making landfall.  
 1989 – a tropical storm that did not impact land.
 2013 – a weak tropical storm that had no impact on land.
 2019 – a weak tropical storm that made landfall on Mexico quickly after forming.

Prudence (1964) – a strong tropical storm that did not threaten land.

Pyarr (2005) – a cyclonic storm that affected eastern India and Bangladesh, killing 84 people.

See also

Tropical cyclone
Tropical cyclone naming
European windstorm names
Atlantic hurricane season
List of Pacific hurricane seasons
South Atlantic tropical cyclone

References
General

 
 
 
 
 
 
 
 
 
 
 
 
 
 
 
 
 

 
 
 
 
 

P